Oakley Creek is a creek in Auckland, New Zealand. While heavily human-modified (being surrounded for most of its length by suburban development, especially in the upper reaches), it has a number of important ecological features, such as having the only natural waterfall on the Auckland isthmus (which is also the largest in urban Auckland).

Geography

The creek is a major stream on the Auckland isthmus, beginning at Mount Roskill and travelling north-west through Wesley, Sandringham, Mt Albert and Avondale, before reaching the Waitematā Harbour at Waterview. After the eruption of Ōwairaka / Mount Albert, the upper reaches of the creek were dammed, and a peat swamp formed around the modern-day suburb of Mount Roskill.

History

Tāmaki Māori used the creek as a source of crayfish, eels and weka. Harakeke (New Zealand flax) and raupō, which grew along the banks of the creek, were harvested here to create Māori traditional textiles.

During the Great Depression in New Zealand in the 1930s, the Auckland and Suburban Drainage Board employed 100 men to straighten and deepen the creek, as a measure intended to present future flooding in the future. In the 1940s and 1950s, there was a major housing boom in the Mount Roskill area. Due to the development, the Oakley Creek regularly flooded, including major floods in Wesley in 1948 and 1953.

In March 1954, major work was undertaken on the Oakley Creek, and volcanic scoria was used as a barrier along the creek's banks. Despite this, Dominion Road would still regularly flood, and continued to up until major works projects were completed in the 1980s.

Revitalisation

The least modified regions, with mostly natural channels and significant riparian vegetation, exists between approximately Blockhouse Bay Road and the inlet at the northern edge of Waterview. A walkway runs along a good part of the creek in the section northwest of Mt Albert. This area of the creek is also significant for a relatively large number of archeologically significant sites, due to the use of the creek by Maori reaching inland from the inlet (landing sites and settlement remnants), and due to the later lack of strong European settlement along this part of the area.

The creek has also inspired a local community group, "Friends of Oakley Creek" which is working to restore it to a more natural state, and improve the water quality. One of the group's major concerns is the impact of the SH20 Waterview Connection on the stream, i.e. the form this motorway is to take under or near the creek. Other concerns include the high levels of metals in the stream, such as zinc, copper and lead, from its urbanised catchment, and the fact that the culvert under Great North Road impedes fish migration.

As one of the results of community interest in the revitalisation of the stream, a set of Oakley Creek Rehabilitation Guidelines was developed for the works which occurred near the stream at around the time the Waterview motorway tunnel building project took place. These primarily included removing the currently rock-lined, tight channelisation of the stream, and reintroducing a riparian margin. Auckland Council adapted the NZTA/Boffa Miskell-developed guidelines for some areas of the stream not affected by the motorway. The native plantings are now becoming well established, although the drought during the summer of 2019/2020 killed a number of ecologically important specimens. Nonetheless the planting includes a good range of native species and an increasing number of native birds are being attracted to the area as a result. The pathway adjacent to the stream has become increasingly popular as a walking and relaxation area for local residents. The project demonstrates the social and ecological value of well conceived environmental restoration initiatives and the importance of involving community groups in the planning, planting and maintenance of such projects.

See also
Hinaki Eel Trap Bridge

References

Bibliography

External links 
Friends of Oakley Creek (community group dedicated to preserving and enhancing the creek)
The Creek Abides (photographic collection centred on the creek)
Photographs of Oakley Creek held in Auckland Libraries' heritage collections.

Geography of Auckland
Rivers of the Auckland Region
Rivers of New Zealand
Urban forests in New Zealand
Waitematā Harbour catchment